ABC Far North is an ABC Local Radio station based in Cairns.  The station broadcasts to Far North Queensland.  This includes the towns of Cooktown, Mossman, Innisfail, Weipa and up to the Torres Strait Islands.

The station began broadcasting as 4QY in 1950, although the 4AT transmitter opened earlier in 1941.  It was originally a relay of the national program.  Studios were then built and local programs began on 4 October 1952.

Along with over 20 low-power FM transmitters, the station broadcasts through the following main AM and FM transmitters:

4QCC 106.7 FM
4QCC/T 105.7 FM
4QCC/T 95.5 FM
4MS 639 AM
4AT 720 AM
4QY 801 AM
4WP 1044 AM
4TI 1062 AM

References

See also
 List of radio stations in Australia

Far North
Radio stations in Queensland